Conistra is a genus of moths of the family Noctuidae. The genus was erected by Jacob Hübner in 1821. There are three subgenera, Orrhodiella, Dasycampa and Peperina.

Species

 Conistra acutula (Staudinger, 1891)
 Conistra albipuncta (Leech, 1889)
 Conistra alicia Lajonquiére, 1939
 Conistra anonyma Hreblay & Ronkay, 1998
 Conistra ardescens (Butler, 1879)
 Conistra ardescentina Hreblay & Ronkay, 1998
 Conistra asiatica Pinker, 1980
 Conistra aulombardi Hreblay, 1992
 Conistra castaneofasciata (Motschulsky, 1860)
 Conistra chaijami Hacker & Weigert, 1986
 Conistra daubei (Duponchel, [1839])
 Conistra dora Hreblay, 1992
 Conistra elegans Hörhammer, 1936
 Conistra eriophora (Püngeler, 1901)
 Conistra erythrocephala (Denis & Schiffermüller, 1775) – red-headed chestnut
 Conistra filipjevi Kononenko, 1978
 Conistra fletcheri Sugi, 1958
 Conistra gabori Hreblay, 1992
 Conistra gallica (Lederer, 1857)
 Conistra grisescens Draudt, 1950
 Conistra intricata (Boisduval, 1829)
 Conistra kasyi Boursin, 1963
 Conistra ligula (Esper, 1791) – dark chestnut
 Conistra metallica Hreblay & Ronkay, 1998
 Conistra metria Boursin, 1940
 Conistra nawae Matsumura, 1926
 Conistra plantei Rungs, 1972
 Conistra politina (Staudinger, 1888)
 Conistra ragusae (Failla-Tedaldi, 1890)
 Conistra rubiginea (Denis & Schiffermüller, 1775) – dotted chestnut
 Conistra rubiginosa (Scopoli, 1763) – black-spot chestnut
 Conistra rubricans Fibiger, 1997
 Conistra staudingeri (Graslin, 1863)
 Conistra takasago Kishida & Yoshimoto, 1979
 Conistra torrida (Lederer, 1857)
 Conistra vaccinii (Linnaeus, 1761) – chestnut
 Conistra veronicae (Hübner, [1813])

References

External links
 

Cuculliinae
Moth genera
Taxa named by Jacob Hübner